"Salt Shaker" is a crunk song released by rap group Ying Yang Twins featuring Lil Jon & the East Side Boyz. It was released on their third studio album, Me & My Brother (2003). It was produced by Lil Jon with guitars played by Craig Love. The song reached the top 10 in the United States, peaking at number 9.

In the United States, "Salt Shaker" became the biggest hit of the Ying Yang Twins' career, debuting in the top 10 at number 9 on February 14, 2004, and staying there for two weeks. In Australia, the song was released as a double A-side CD single with "Naggin'".

The official remix featured Lil Jon & the East Side Boyz, Murphy Lee, Fat Joe and Juvenile. There is an official extended remix of the above artists and additional verses by Fatman Scoop, Jacki-O, B.G., and Pitbull. There is also a remix on DJ Drama's Gangsta Grillz X with Big Boi and Snoop Dogg. Later, it was re-played in 2020 on 98-PXYz.

Charts

Weekly charts

Year-end charts

References

2004 singles
Lil Jon songs
Ying Yang Twins songs
Song recordings produced by Lil Jon
2003 songs
Songs written by Lil Jon
Songs written by Craig Love
Dirty rap songs
Crunk songs
TVT Records singles